Ryan Craig Denney (born June 15, 1977) is a former American football defensive end. He was  drafted by the Buffalo Bills in the second round (61st overall) of the 2002 NFL Draft. He played college football at BYU.

Denney also played for the Houston Texans.

Early years
Denney attended Horizon High School (Thornton, Colorado) and won three varsity letters in football and two in basketball. In football, as a senior, he was named the Denver Post Defensive Player of the Year, won All-Conference honors as both an offensive lineman and as a defensive lineman, and won All-State honors as a defensive lineman. Denney graduated from Horizon High School in 1995. He served as a Mormon missionary for two years in Argentina before playing for Brigham Young University in college.

College career 
Denney was two-year starter at BYU and finished his career with 156 tackles (92 solos), 16 quarterback sacks, 40 stops behind the line of scrimmage and  13 pass deflections. As a senior, was a Second-team All-America selection by The NFL Draft Report, earning fourth-team honors from The Sporting News He was an  Academic All-American  and a First-team  All-Mountain West Conference selection. He started all year at right defensive end and recorded 68 tackles (45 solos) as he led the team with seven sacks and 19 tackles for losses and intercepted a pass and ranked second on the squad with eight pass deflections. In 2000, he earned Academic All-Mountain West Conference honors. He missed the 1996-97 season while serving on a mission in Buenos Aires, Argentina.

Professional career

Buffalo Bills
Ryan had a spectacular game against the Miami Dolphins on September 17, 2006, when he recorded 3 sacks on Miami quarterback, Daunte Culpepper in just the first half of the game.

On August 17, 2007, during the opening kickoff of a preseason game against the Atlanta Falcons, Denney suffered a broken bone in his foot.   He was one of three Bills position players to play in every year since 2003.

At the end of the 2007 NFL season he had played in the league for six years.

He caught a touchdown in the Bills season opener September 7, 2008 from a Brian Moorman pass on a fake field goal and one more in 2009, again on a fake field goal.

On February 27, 2010, the Buffalo Bills announced that they would not be offering Ryan Denney a contract which rendered him an unrestricted free agent.

Houston Texans

On September 15, 2010, the Houston Texans announced they had signed Denney to an undisclosed contract.  On October 7, 2010, the Texans waived Denney.

Family
Ryan is the brother of Miami Dolphins long snapper John Denney, who also wears number 92 on his jersey. Ryan and his wife, Laura have four daughters, Kyle, Kate, Alli and Samantha, and two sons, Tyler and Will. He is also the brother-in-law of Doug Jolley, former NFL tight end for the New York Jets.

References

External links
Buffalo Bills bio

1977 births
Living people
Players of American football from Denver
American football defensive ends
American Mormon missionaries in Argentina
20th-century Mormon missionaries
BYU Cougars football players
Buffalo Bills players
Houston Texans players
Latter Day Saints from Colorado
People from Thornton, Colorado